Anthony Joseph Wilson (born 6 July 1937) is a British politician who served as a member of the European Parliament.

Wilson was born in Birkenhead and was educated at Loughborough College and the University of Wales.  He became a teacher, then spent time as a manager and as a lecturer.  He became active in the Labour Party, serving on Wrexham Borough Council, also chairing Wrexham Trades Council.  At the 1983 general election, he stood unsuccessfully for Montgomeryshire.

At the 1989 European Parliament election, Wilson was elected to represent North Wales, and spent time as the European Parliamentary Labour Party's spokesperson on agriculture and rural affairs.  He stood down in 1999.

Parliamentary service
Vice-Chair, Delegation for relations with Canada (1992–1994)

References

Living people
1937 births
Alumni of the University of Wales
Alumni of Loughborough College
People from Birkenhead
British socialists
MEPs for Wales 1989–1994
MEPs for Wales 1994–1999
Welsh Labour councillors
Welsh Labour MEPs